The Epistle to the Son of the Wolf is the last major work of Baháʼu'lláh, founder of the Baháʼí Faith, written in 1891 just before his death in 1892. It is a letter written to "the son of the Wolf," Shaykh Muhammad Taqi known as Áqá Najafi (1846-1914), a Muslim cleric in Isfáhán, where his family was the most powerful clerical family. Baháʼu'lláh called the father, Shaykh Muhammad Báqir (1819-1883), the Wolf because of his responsibility for the execution of the Nahrí brothers in Isfahan in 1879. The father and son were known for their persecution of the Baháʼís.

Background

In the book, Baháʼu'lláh admonishes Áqá Najafi ('Son of Wolf') and calls upon him to repent. His father Shaykh Muhammad Báqir, ('Wolf') and Mír Muḥammad Ḥusayn, the Imám Jum'ih of Isfahán, surnamed ('She-Serpent') were the conspirators against two brothers, Muhammad-Husayn Nahrí and Muhammad-Hasan Nahrí. The brothers came from an aristocratic and established mercantile family in Isfahan. The Imám-Jum'ih of the city owed the brothers money and – when the two asked for a payment – he devised a plan to rid his debt. After confronting Shaykh Muhammad-Baqir and Sultán-Mas'úd Mírzá, the son of Násiri'd-Dín Sháh of this issue, the three devised a plan to imprison the brothers on account of their Baháʼí Faith. The two brothers were subsequently arrested, paraded around Isfahan with crowds jeering abuse, and publicly executed in a humiliating manner. Baháʼu'lláh wrote several tablets lamenting the loss of the two brothers, and denouncing the treachery that provoked their murder. One such tablet, Lawh-i-Burhán, addressed to Shaykh Muhammad Báqir accuses him and his accomplice Mír Muḥammad Ḥusayn of the persecution of the Baháʼís.

Baháʼu'lláh was heartbroken by the death of the brothers – he had met the two whilst a prisoner in Adrianople. He eulogized the two, naming them the "King of Martyrs" and the "Beloved of Martyrs", and the "Twin Shining Lights".

Content
In this book Baháʼu'lláh described historical events such as His "arrest in Níyávarán and of the kind of chains that bound Him and of the machinations against Him by members of the Persian embassy in Constantinople. He also wrote about his suggestion to Kamál Páshá, a Turkish official, that his government convene a gathering to plan for a world language and script. In the book entitled God Passes By, Shoghi Effendi gave the date of this meeting as 1863.

In this work Baháʼu'lláh quotes extensively from his own previously revealed scriptures. This makes a large portion of the work a summary of excerpts on critical concepts expressed in previous works in a condensed form.

Crimson Book
In the Epistle to the Son of Wolf Baha'u'llah alluded to His own Will and Testament — the Kitáb-i-'Ahd — as the Crimson Book. In this document he named his son ʻAbdu'l-Bahá as his successor.

References

External links
 Baháʼí Reference Library. Text of the English translation.

Works by Baháʼu'lláh
1892 non-fiction books
Letters (message)